Mohammed Saleh may refer to:
 Abu Muhammad Salih al-Majiri, Sufi leader from Morocco and one of the successors of Abu Madyan
 Mohammed Saleh (politician), Nigerian politician elected Senator for Kaduna Central on 9 April 2011
 Mohammed Saleh (Palestinian footballer), Palestinian footballer
Mohammed Saleh Suleiman (born 1998), Emirati footballer
 Mohammed Saleh Al Sada, minister of industry and energy of Qatar
 Mohammed Saleh Ahmed Al-Helali, Ambassador Extraordinary and Plenipotentiary of the Republic of Yemen to the Russian Federation
 Jasim Mohammed Saleh, Iraqi lBaathist who commanded the Iraqi Army under Saddam Hussein
 Osman Saleh Mohammed, first Minister of Education for Eritrea following independence
 Khaled Mohammed (Khaled Mohammed Saleh, born 2000), Qatari footballer
 Mohammed Abdullah Saleh, Yemeni major general

See also
 Saleh Mohammad (disambiguation)